Stan Gustafson (born May 7, 1942) is an American lawyer and politician from the state of Iowa. A Republican, he serves in the Iowa House of Representatives

In August, 2005, Gustafson was recalled in a special election from the Los Osos Community Sewer District [CISD] due to a controversy over developing a new sewer system.  After the recall of three members of the board (Stan Gustafson, President; Gordon Hensley, Member; Richard Le Gros, Member), the city of Los Osos defaulted on low interest loans from a state revolving fund and filed for Chapter 9 bankruptcy protection in federal court.

On January 7, 2014, Gustafson won a special election to succeed Julian Garrett in the Iowa House for the 25th district.

Gustafson was born in Washington, D.C. He served as a lieutenant colonel in the United States Marine Corps.

References

External links
 Stan Gustafson at Iowa Legislature
 Stan Gustafson at Iowa House Republicans
 
 Biography at Ballotpedia

1942 births
Living people
Republican Party members of the Iowa House of Representatives
Iowa lawyers
United States Marine Corps officers
21st-century American politicians